Halo, halos or haloes usually refer to:
 Halo (optical phenomenon)
 Halo (religious iconography), a ring of light around the image of a head

HALO, halo, halos or haloes may also refer to:

Arts and entertainment

Video games
 Halo (franchise), a video game franchise
 Halo: Combat Evolved, the first game in the series
 Halo 2, the second game in the series
 Halo 3, the third game in the series
 Halo Array, fictional megastructures and superweapons in the franchise

Film and television
 Halo (1996 film), a drama film made in India
 Halo (2007 cancelled film), a cancelled movie based on Halo video game franchise
 Halo (TV series), a 2022 TV series based on the Halo video game franchise
 Nickelodeon HALO Awards, annual American television special (2008–2018)

Comics
 Comics in the Halo franchise
 Halo (DC Comics), a fictional superheroine
 the title character of The Ballad of Halo Jones, a science-fiction comic strip

Music
 Halo Records

Bands and musicians
 Halo (Christian rock band), an American band
 Halo (metal band), an Australian band
 Halo (UK band)
 HALO (South Korean group)
 The Halos, an American doo wop group
 Laurel Halo, stage name of American electronic musician Laurel Anne Chartow (born 1985)

Albums
 Halo (Azonic album) (1994)
 Halo (Current 93 album) (2004)
 Halo (Juana Molina album) (2017)
 Halo, by Severina (2019)

Songs
 "Halo" (Beyoncé song) (2008)
 "Halo" (Lumix song) (2022)
 "Halo" (Soil song) (2001)
 "Halo" (Starset song) (2015)
 "Halo" (Texas song) (1997)
 "Haloes", a song from the album The Tubes by The Tubes
  "Halo", by All That Remains from Madness
 "Halo", by Basement from Promise Everything
 "Halo", by Bethany Joy Galeotti from Friends with Benefits: Music from the Television Series One Tree Hill, Volume 2
 "Halo", by Bloc Party from Intimacy
 "Halo", by Cage the Elephant from Melophobia
 "Halo", by The Cure from Join the Dots
 "Halo", by Deep Blue Something from Home
 "Halo", by Depeche Mode from Violator
 "Halo", by Endless Shame from Generation Blind
 "Halo", by Foo Fighters from One by One
 "Halo", by Linkin Park from LP Underground X: Demos
 "Halo", by Hieroglyphics from Full Circle
 "Halo", by Machine Head from The Blackening
 "Halo", by Porcupine Tree from Deadwing
 "Halo", by The Pussycat Dolls from Doll Domination
 "Halo", by Red Flag
 "Halo", by Ryan Adams from Prisoner (B-Sides)
 "Halo", by Slash from Apocalyptic Love
 "Halo", by Tinchy Stryder from Catch 22
 "Halo", by Takida from Bury the Lies

Other arts and entertainment
 Halo (sculpture), a wind-driven kinetic sculpture in Sydney, Australia
 Halo (b-boy move), a dance move

Astronomy and space
 Dark matter halo, a hypothetical structure in outer space
 Galactic halo, a component of a galaxy
 Halo orbit, a concept in orbital mechanics
 Helium and Lead Observatory, a supernova neutrino detector
 Habitation and Logistics Outpost (HALO) module of the planned Lunar Gateway space station
 Halo (crater), on the Moon
 Stellar halo

Military
 HALO jump, High Altitude-Low Opening parachute jump
 Operation Halo, the Canadian contribution to the 2004 United Nations Stabilization Mission in Haiti
 Mil Mi-26, a Soviet/Russian heavy transport helicopter (NATO reporting name: Halo)

Medicine and psychology
 Halo brace, a cervical brace
 Halo effect, a cognitive bias
 Halo sign, a radiological diagnostic

Places

Ancient Greece
 Halos (Thessaly), a town and polis of ancient Thessaly
 Halos (Delphi), a space near the temple of Apollo in Delphi

United States
 Halo (bar), a gay bar in Washington, D.C.
 Halo, Kentucky
 Halo, West Virginia

People
 Halo Khan Ardalan, Kurdish ruler of Ardalan from 1590 to 1616
 Halo Meadows (1905–1985), American actress
 Thea Halo (born 1941), American writer and painter
 Takashi Hirose (swimmer) (died 2002)

Sport
 Halo (safety device), for racing cars
 Halo (horse) (1969–2000)
 Los Angeles Angels, a Major League Baseball team, nicknamed the Halos

Other uses
 Halo (mathematics), in non-standard analysis
 The HALO or HALO Urban Regeneration, a Scottish urban regeneration and start-up support company
 Project Halo, in artificial intelligence
 Halo antenna
 Halo nucleus, in physics
 HALO Trust (Hazardous Area Life-support Organization), which removes war debris, particularly land mines
 Halo, a wireless vehicle charging company and technology under WiTricity, formerly owned by Qualcomm and known as HaloIPT

See also
 Halo- (disambiguation)
 Helo (disambiguation)
 Halo-halo, a Filipino dessert
 "Halo, Halo", 1982 Yugoslavian song